
Year 81 BC was a year of the pre-Julian Roman calendar. At the time it was known as the Year of the Consulship of Decula and Dolabella (or, less frequently, year 673 Ab urbe condita). The denomination 81 BC for this year has been used since the early medieval period, when the Anno Domini calendar era became the prevalent method in Europe for naming years.

Events 
 By place 

 Roman Republic 
 Sulla is appointed dictator, executes his political enemies in a series of proscriptions, and implements aristocratic reforms to the Roman government.
 The Second Mithridatic War ends with the status quo.
 Cicero wins his first case.

 China 
Sang Hongyang and 60 Confucian scholars debate over the state monopoly of Iron and Salt.

Births

Deaths 
 Artaxias I (or Arshak), king of Iberia (Georgia)
 Gnaeus Domitius Ahenobarbus, Roman politician 
 Ptolemy IX Lathyros, king of Ptolemaic Egypt

References